Accrington Stanley Football Club is a professional association football club based in Accrington, Lancashire, England. The club competes in League One, the third tier of the English football league system. They have spent their complete history playing at the Crown Ground. The club came to national prominence in 1989 due to the Milk Marketing Board's popular television advert that featured the slogan Accrington Stanley, Who Are They?

The current club was formed in 1968, two years after the collapse of the original Accrington Stanley, which played in the Football League from 1921 to 1962 after initially competing in the Lancashire Combination. The town's original club, named simply Accrington, were founder members of the Football League in 1888, though folded just six years later. The current incarnation of the club entered the Lancashire Combination and moved on to the Cheshire County League after winning the Combination title in 1977–78. Stanley won Division Two of the Cheshire County League in 1980–81 and became founder members of the North West Counties League in 1982, before being placed in Division One of the Northern Premier League five years later. They were promoted to the Premier Division in 1990–91, though were relegated in 1999.

The early 21st century saw the club win three promotions over the course of seven seasons under the stewardship of John Coleman to gain a place in the Football League. They won three divisional titles in each of their three promotions: Northern Premier League Division One (1999–2000), Northern Premier League Premier Division (2002–03) and the Conference National (2005–06). They then spent 12 seasons mostly in the bottom half of the table in League Two, though did also lose two play-off semi-finals, before Coleman led them to promotion into League One as League Two champions in 2017–18.

History

Re-formation (1968–2003)
Accrington had been without a football team following the collapse of the original Accrington Stanley in 1966. The original team had been formed in 1891 and played in the Football League from 1921 to March 1962, but had spent its final four seasons in the Lancashire Combination. At a meeting at Bold Street Working Men's Club in 1968 the revival was initiated, and in August 1970 the new club played at a new ground, the Crown Ground. Eric Whalley, a local businessman, took control of the club in 1995 and began the development of the club's ground. After the club was relegated in 1999, Whalley appointed John Coleman as manager.

The club's rise to the Football League is attributed in part to the windfall of hundreds of thousands of pounds reaped by the sell-on clause in the December 2001 transfer of former Stanley star Brett Ormerod to Southampton, which paid Blackpool over a million pounds for his contract. Stanley had taken £50,000 from Blackpool in 1997, with the agreement that Blackpool would pay Accrington a quarter of what it might have received if it in turn transferred Ormerod to another team. The 2002–03 championship of the Northern Premier League followed quickly on Accrington getting the cash.

Conference years (2003–2006)
In May 2003, the club was promoted for the first time in history to the Football Conference, following its win of the Northern Premier League. The club's first-ever game in the league was away to another reformed club, Aldershot Town, on Sunday 10 August 2003. The game was shown live on Sky Sports and resulted in a 2–1 loss. The season was a success, with a final league position of 10th being achieved. The highlight of that first season in the 5th tier was a run to the FA Cup 3rd round, losing in a replay at League One side Colchester United.

In 2004, Accrington Stanley turned professional. The following 2004–05 season, Stanley yet again achieved a final position of 10th placed, with Stanley legend Paul Mullin amongst the top goal scorers yet again, adding another 20 to his tally.

Stanley's stay in the Conference didn't last long, with the club returning to the Football League at the end of the 2005–06 season. Finishing on 91 points, the club went on a 19-game unbeaten run stretching from October to March, leaving the club an easy passage to League Two. The likes of Paul Mullin, Rob Elliot and Gary Roberts led the club back to the league after 46 years away.

Return to the Football League (2006)

EFL League Two (2006–2018) 
The club's first Football League game took place on 5 August 2006 away to now-defunct club Chester City; it resulted in a 2–0 loss.  The club was involved in a relegation battle throughout its first season in the 4th tier. A run of 5 wins in the last 9 games of the season led to a 20th-place finish and was enough to save the club from relegation in its first season back in the Football League.

Highlights of that first season back included the club's first-ever Football League Cup match against former European Cup Winners Nottingham Forest. The game resulted in a 1–0 win, leaving the club a 2nd-round away tie against then Premier League team Watford, eventually losing 6–5 on penalties after a 0–0 draw and extra-time. The club also took part in the Football League Trophy for the first time as a league club (after playing in the two previous seasons as one of 12 Conference sides, beating Bradford City away in September 2004) and, after defeating Carlisle United and Blackpool in the early rounds, were knocked out by Doncaster Rovers in the Area Quarter-finals.

The 2007–08 season produced more of the same, with the club involved in another relegation battle with strugglers Chester City, Wrexham and Mansfield Town. 5 wins in the final 12 games were enough to secure a 17th-place finish and another season in the 4th tier of English Football. However, the club failed to win a game in the FA Cup and League Cup, losing to Huddersfield Town and Leicester City respectively.

Performance during the 2008–09 season improved, with the club achieving a modest 16th-place finish in League Two. A run of 6 League wins in the last 12 games was a nice way to finish the season. This season saw the emergence of young prospect Bobby Grant, who finally fulfilled the early promise seen in previous seasons. The club again failed to make it past the early round of any of the domestic cups, losing in the first round to Wolverhampton Wanderers in the League Cup and Tranmere Rovers in both the FA Cup (albeit after a replay) and Football League Trophy.

The 2009–10 season was far better, with the club pushing for a playoff place at the turn of the year. A run of 9 wins in 10 League games saw the club with a chance of making the playoffs, only for this to fade in March/April. The emergence of the Michael Symes and Bobby Grant partnership was a key aspect and, following their achievements throughout the season, both moved on to bigger clubs. In terms of cup performance the club was superb, reaching the 2nd round of the League Cup losing only 2–1 to Queens Park Rangers, the quarter-finals of the Football League Trophy losing 2–0 to Leeds United, and the 4th round of the FA Cup losing 3–1 to Premier League team Fulham.

The club reached the Football League Two play-offs during the 2010–11 season, one of the most successful in its history. A run of 1 loss in 19 games, from February till May, saw the club finish in a best-ever 5th position, eventually losing to League Two newcomers Stevenage in the Playoff Semi-finals. The season saw the emergence of Jimmy Ryan as a star in the making, along with a number of others, including goalkeeper Alex Cisak and midfielder Sean McConville. In the domestic cups, Stanley reached the 2nd round of the League Cup, losing 3–2 to Premier League team Newcastle United. The club actually won the 1st-round game of the Football League Trophy away to Tranmere Rovers, but was then forced to resign from the competition after fielding the ineligible Ray Putterill in the game. The club also reached the 2nd round of the FA Cup, but lost to fellow League Two side Port Vale.

2011–12 was a season of transition for the club. The loss of no less than six of the playoff-chasing side of the previous season was a tough act to follow. Following a shaky start to the season the arrival of Bryan Hughes in October transformed the club's fortunes. A run of 6 wins in 7 games over the Christmas period saw the club briefly enter the play-offs. However, following the sale of club captain Andrew Procter to Preston North End in the January 2012 transfer window, the third-longest serving management team of John Coleman and Jimmy Bell departed for Rochdale. Former Burnley and club favourite Paul Cook was brought in as manager, along with the promotion of Leam Richardson from caretaker manager to full-time assistant. Only 3 wins in the final 17 games of the season was a pretty poor finish the season. However, this meant the club achieved a solid mid-table finish in 14th position. In terms of the domestic cups Stanley exited both the League Cup and FA Cup at the 1st round stages, losing to Scunthorpe United and Notts County respectively. The club reached the second round of the Football League Trophy, after knocking out holders Carlisle United, but lost to Tranmere Rovers in the 2nd round after an eventual replay. This was following a serious head injury to young defender Thomas Bender in the initial tie.

Andy Holt's stewardship (2015–present) 
On 28 October 2015, the board of Accrington Stanley voted to approve local businessman Andy Holt's takeover of the club. Holt, whose company What More UK sponsored, and still sponsor, Stanley's Wham Stadium, attained a majority share of 75% in Accrington Stanley, in return for clearing the club's £1.2m debt as well as providing the club with further funds of £600,000. Stanley's chairman, Peter Marsden, remained as chairman whilst five new people joined the club's board. At the time of the takeover, Stanley had been on the verge of folding due to crippling debts and its inability to fund day-to-day running costs, including wages and its suppliers. Due to its precarious financial situation, the club had been accepting sponsorship deals at a value lower than what should have been demanded.

Holt's involvement with Stanley began in July 2015, when Holt attended Stanley's pre-season friendly at home against local rivals Burnley, which they won 4-2. It was during this game that Holt got an insight into the dire state of Stanley, having discovered that the club's bar was unable to serve spectators as a result of its failure to pay its suppliers. In his first season as owner of the club, the 2015-16 Football League Two season, the club narrowly missed out on promotion to League One on the final day of the season, having been held to a 0-0 draw with Stevenage. Stanley were then defeated in the semi-final of the League Two play-offs, losing 3-2 on aggregate to AFC Wimbledon, with Wimbledon going on to defeat Plymouth Argyle 2-0 in the play-off final. At the end of the season, Stanley lost several of its players who had helped spur them on a promotion push, such as Tom Davies, Ross Etheridge and Josh Windass, who had agreed contracts with clubs in a position to offer higher wages than Stanley had been able to. With Windass and Crooks being under-24, Stanley received £120,000 for the duo's transfer to Rangers.

During the 2016-17 pre-season, Stanley made several improvements to the facilities on offer at the Crown Ground, including the replacement of vendors with its own in-house service. It was also during the 2016-17 pre-season that Stanley's chairman, Marsden, stepped down after a decade at the helm of the club. Marsden was replaced by Holt in the position. In the following 2016-17 Football League Two season, Stanley finished mid-table in 13th position, having struggled to replicate its promotion push from the season before. The club had, however, enjoyed a run to the fourth round of the FA Cup, with a 1-0 defeat away to Middlesbrough putting an end to their cup campaign.

EFL League One (2018–present) 
At the end of the 2017-18 Football League season Stanley gained promotion to League One, with their 2-0 win over Yeovil Town on 17 April 2018 sealing the League Two title. In their first season in League One finished the season in 14th place.

In January 2020, Stanley icon Billy Kee announced his retirement from professional football, having battled with mental health issues that had seen Kee last appear for Stanley the previous season. In honour of the forward, Stanley announced that they were to retire Kee's 29 shirt number.

Name 
The original town club, Accrington, was amongst the twelve founder members of the Football League in 1888, before resigning from the league after just five years. A team called Stanley Villa already existed at the time, named as such because they were based at the Stanley W.M.C. on Stanley Street in Accrington. With the demise of Accrington, Stanley Villa took the town name to become Accrington Stanley.

Stadium
Since leaving Peel Park, the club has played at the Crown Ground, currently known as the Wham Stadium as part of a three-year £200,000 sponsorship deal with What More UK Ltd.

Prior to Holt's takeover of Stanley, the Crown Ground had a reputation for being one of the poorest grounds within the top four leagues of English football. However, Holt's stewardship of the club lead to changes at the Crown Ground, with initial changes including improved match day facilities before the construction of a new Whinney Hill Stand, which was built and completed in late-2018.

The following season, Stanley invested around £300,000 in a new playing field, a move which saw new draining and a levelled pitch installed to overcome the club's issue with recurring floods towards the Coppice End.

In January 2021, work begun on the construction of a new and improved Jack Barrett Stand, work which will see a new bar and hospitality area provided as part of the plans.

Rivalries
According to a survey conducted in August 2019, Stanley supporters consider traditional Lancashire clubs Rochdale, Morecambe and Bury to be their biggest rivals, with near neighbours Blackburn Rovers and Burnley following.

Television advertisement

In the 1980s, the club was mentioned in a British advert for milk, which briefly brought the club to the attention of the general public. The advertisement featured two boys in Liverpool replica shirts played by young actors Carl Rice and Kevin Staine. It made reference to Accrington Stanley's obscurity in comparison to Liverpool's success at the time.
Boy 1: "Milk! Urghh!"
Boy 2: "It's what Ian Rush drinks."
Boy 1: "Ian Rush?"
Boy 2: "Yeah. And he said if I didn't drink lots of milk, when I grow up, I'll only be good enough to play for Accrington Stanley."
Boy 1: "Accrington Stanley, who are they?"
Boy 2: "Exactly."

In the weekly football show, Soccer AM, the phrase "Accrington Stanley, who are they?" is said every time a fixture is read out that has the club in it, referring to the milk advert.

Players

Current squad

Out on loan

Former players
In a PFA Fans' Favourites survey published by the Professional Footballers' Association in December 2007, Chris Grimshaw was listed as the all-time favourite player amongst Accrington Stanley fans.

Club officials/staff
 Chairman: Andy Holt
 Directors: Thomas O'Neill/Virginia Hargreaves
 Head of Youth Development: Duncan Fearnhead
 Manager: John Coleman
 Assistant Manager: Jimmy Bell
 First Team Coach: John Doolan
 First Team GK Coach: Andy Dibble
 Under 18 Manager: John Miles 
 Under 18 Assistant Manager: Andy Gray
 Coach U18 Team: Dave Fitzgerald
 Chief Doctor: Joyce Watson
 Head Therapist: Matthew Donnelly
 Kitman: George Quigley
 Physio: Paul Morgan
 Sports Scientist U18 Team: Martin Whalley
 Scout: Ashley Hoskin

Managerial history

Honours

 EFL League Two: 
 Winners: 2017–18
Conference National:
Winners: 2005–06
Northern Premier League:
Winners: 2002–03
Northern Premier League Division One:
Winners: 1999–00
Northern Premier League Challenge Cup
Winners: 2001–02
Northern Premier League Challenge Shield:
Winners: 2002–03
North West Counties League Division One:
Runners up: 1986–87
Cheshire County League Division 2:
Winners: 1980–81
Runners up: 1979–80
Lancashire Combination:
Winners (2): 1973–74, 1977–78
Runners up (2): 1971–72, 1975–76
Lancashire Combination Cup:
Winners (4): 1971–72, 1972–73, 1973–74, 1976–77
Lancashire Combination League Cup:
Winners: 1971–72

See also
 List of Accrington Stanley F.C. players

References

External links

Official website
Current and past player biographies – Official Site
Accrington Stanley News

 
English Football League clubs
Sport in Hyndburn
Association football clubs established in 1968
Accrington
1968 establishments in England
Lancashire Combination
North West Counties Football League clubs
Northern Premier League clubs
National League (English football) clubs
Football clubs in Lancashire
Phoenix clubs (association football)
Football clubs in England
Cheshire County League clubs